Wild spinach is a common name for several plants with edible leaves and may refer to:

Species in the genus Chenopodium:
Chenopodium album, a common weed with global distribution
Chenopodium bonus-henricus

Species in the genus Cleome
Cleome foliosa, native to Africa
Cleome gynandra, native to Africa
Cleome serrulata, native to western North America